Milan Hejduk (born February 14, 1976) is a Czech–American former professional ice hockey forward. Nicknamed "the Duke", he spent his entire 14-year National Hockey League (NHL) career with the Colorado Avalanche and retired holding the record for most career games as an Avalanche player with 1,020. In 2003, he won the Maurice "Rocket" Richard Trophy as the NHL's leading goal scorer. He is a member of Czech Ice Hockey Hall of Fame.

Playing career
The 6-foot-tall, 190-pound Hejduk was drafted 87th overall by the Quebec Nordiques in the fourth round of the 1994 NHL Entry Draft, after a year with HC Pardubice in the Czech Extraliga, after winning Czech Rookie of the Year with 11 goals in 32 games. He stayed with Pardubice until 1998, scoring 14, 13, 27 and 26 goals in his next four seasons respectively before transferring to the NHL after the 1997–98 season.

Hejduk won the Maurice "Rocket" Richard Trophy as the NHL's top goalscorer when he scored 50 goals for the Avalanche in the 2002–03 season, narrowly surpassing Markus Näslund of the Vancouver Canucks, who had been leading for most of the season. Hejduk scored a goal against the Calgary Flames in a 3–0 win for the Avalanche on March 12, 2006, tying him with Peter Forsberg in sixth place on the all-time Avalanche franchise goalscoring list with 216 goals. He won the Stanley Cup in the 2000–01 season with the Avalanche.

During the 2004–05 NHL lockout, Hejduk returned to HC Pardubice, scoring 25 goals in 48 Czech Extraliga games. He won the Extraliga title with Pardubice.

In the 2008–09 season, Hejduk scored his 300th career NHL goal alongside Ryan Smyth on January 18, 2009, against the Calgary Flames in a 6–2 victory at the Pepsi Center. He dressed for all 82 games that year for the Avalanche and ended what was, at that point, their most unsuccessful season in history tied with Smyth as the Avs' top scorer with 59 points. Milan also led the Avalanche for the fifth time in his career with 27 goals.

Prior to the 2009–10 season, on September 24, 2009, Hejduk signed a new one-year contract with Colorado effective for the 2010–11 season. Alongside long-time teammate and team captain Adam Foote, Hejduk provided veteran leadership to a re-invigorated, youth-laden Avalanche side to start the year. After initially persisting with a knee and back injuries through the first half of the season, on January 19, 2010, Milan opted to undergo arthroscopic knee surgery and forgo participating in the 2010 Winter Olympics with the Czech Republic to recoup. After over one month on the sidelines, Hejduk scored two goals against the St. Louis Blues to mark his return on March 7. In helping Colorado return to the Stanley Cup playoffs, he completed the year to place third on the team with 23 goals despite playing in a career-low 56 games. He scored just one goal in the 2010 playoffs before he succumbed to a head injury after a collision with line-mate Paul Stastny in Game 3 of the Western Conference Quarterfinals series defeat against the San Jose Sharks.

On May 11, 2011, Hejduk signed another one-year contract with the Avalanche effective for the 2011–12 season. On November 14, he was named the third captain in Avalanche history after a brief vacancy was left by Adam Foote's retirement. Hejduk saw a decline in his offensive production for his first season as captain. Scoring 14 goals and 37 points in 81 games, this ended his impressive career streak of 12-straight 20-plus-goal seasons. Shortly after the 2011–12 season, after the Avs would miss the playoffs for the second time in two years, Hejduk expressed his consideration to retire from the NHL. Despite these statements, on May 18, 2012, he signed a one-year contract with the Avalanche for the 2012–13 season worth $2 million. In September 2012, he relinquished his captaincy due to his role in the organization changing. He admitted to being happy to have given up his captaincy to a player who he thinks is going to be a franchise player for a long time.

In the lockout-shortened 2012–13 season, Hejduk became the last player drafted by the Quebec Nordiques still active in the NHL, after goaltender Tim Thomas opted for a year on hiatus. On February 4, 2013, in a 3–2 defeat to the Dallas Stars, Hejduk scored a goal in his 1,000th career NHL game. He became the first Avalanche player in history to appear in 1,000 games for the club and the 30th in NHL history to do so at a single franchise. On his 37th birthday, Hejduk scored a goal and a shoot-out goal in a 4–3 victory over the Minnesota Wild on February 14, 2013. The goal marked his 800th point in the NHL, becoming just the third Czech-born player in NHL history to reach the feat, behind only Jaromír Jágr and Patrik Eliáš. Despite the shortened season, Hejduk saw his scoring role reduced by head coach Joe Sacco. With injury and bouts of healthy scratches, he contributed from the checking lines with a career-low 4 goals and 11 points in only 29 games played.

Despite harbouring ambition to continue playing, Hejduk was not offered a new contract by the Avalanche upon the expiry of his contract. He finished his tenure ranked second in Quebec/Colorado franchise history in games played (1,020), fourth in goals (375) and points (805) and fifth in assists (430), while also the all-time franchise leader in overtime goals (9) and second in game-winning goals (59).

Reports surfaced on November 13, 2013, that Hejduk was ending his hockey career, which were confirmed after the 2014 Olympic break. At the time of his retirement, he was the last player to leave the Avalanche that had played on their 2001 Stanley Cup-winning team.

On September 13, 2017, it was announced that the Avalanche would retire Hejduk's number 23 jersey during the 2017–18 season, and it was officially retired on January 6, 2018.

NHL All-Star Games
Hejduk has been selected to play in three NHL All-Star Games. In the 2000 All-Star Game, he played on the World team in a 9–4 win over North America. He earned a primary assist on Pavol Demitra's third period goal. For the 2001 All-Star Game, he was chosen to replace an injured Jaromír Jágr in the starting line-up, one of the six Avalanche players selected as starters. However, he did not record a point in a 14–12 loss to North America. In 2009, he was selected as the only Av in the All-Star lineup for the year's Game. He recorded one goal and two assists in a 12–11 shootout loss to the Eastern Conference.

Personal life
Hejduk is married to Zlatuse and has twin sons named Marek and David, born January 3, 2004. In 2016, Hejduk became an American citizen. Marek began playing for Harvard in the fall of 2022. David is committed to join the program the following year.

Career statistics

Regular season and playoffs

International

Awards and honours

References

External links
 

1976 births
Living people
Colorado Avalanche players
Czech expatriate ice hockey players in the United States
Czech ice hockey right wingers
HC Dynamo Pardubice players
Ice hockey players at the 1998 Winter Olympics
Ice hockey players at the 2002 Winter Olympics
Ice hockey players at the 2006 Winter Olympics
Medalists at the 1998 Winter Olympics
Medalists at the 2006 Winter Olympics
National Hockey League All-Stars
National Hockey League players with retired numbers
Olympic bronze medalists for the Czech Republic
Olympic gold medalists for the Czech Republic
Olympic ice hockey players of the Czech Republic
Olympic medalists in ice hockey
Sportspeople from Ústí nad Labem
Quebec Nordiques draft picks
Rocket Richard Trophy winners
Stanley Cup champions